Sapphire Ridge is a census-designated place (CDP) in Judith Basin County, Montana, United States. The community is more commonly known as Sapphire Village. It is in the southern part of the county, on the west side of the valley of the Judith River, a northeast-flowing tributary of the Missouri River.

Pigeye Road is the main route out of the community, leading northeast  down the Judith River valley to Utica. To the southwest the road leads into the Little Belt Mountains and Lewis and Clark National Forest.

Sapphire Ridge was first listed as a CDP prior to the 2020 census.

Demographics

References 

Census-designated places in Judith Basin County, Montana
Census-designated places in Montana